Molde Concert is a live album by Norwegian jazz bassist and composer Arild Andersen recorded in 1981 and released on the ECM label (ECM 1236). Though highly regarded in present day reviews, Molde Concert was less well received by contemporary critics. The album is notable for the inclusion of Bill Frisell in the line-up, in one of his first appearances on an ECM release.

Track listing
All compositions by Arild Andersen except as indicated
 "Cherry Tree" - 7:04 
 "Targeta" - 7:25 
 "Six for Alphonse" - 8:24 Bonus track on CD reissue
 "Nutune" - 7:34 Bonus track on CD reissue 
 "Lifelines" (Arild Andersen, Radka Toneff) - 4:01 
 "The Sword Under His Wings" - 13:19 
 "Commander Schmuck's Earflap Hat" - 4:40 
 "Koral" - 7:02 
 "Cameron" - 9:37 
 "A Song I Used to Play" - 4:55 Bonus track on CD reissue 
 "Dual Mr. Tillman Anthony" (Miles Davis) - 4:40 Bonus track on CD reissue 
Recorded at the Molde Jazz Festival in Norway in August 1981

Personnel
Arild Andersen - bass
Bill Frisell - guitar
John Taylor - piano
Alphonse Mouzon - drums

References

ECM Records live albums
Arild Andersen albums
1982 albums
Albums produced by Manfred Eicher